Goran Roce (born 12 April 1986) is a Croatian retired footballer who last played for NK Istra 1961.

Club career
Roce started his career in 2003 with Žminj in Croatia’s 3. HNL. Following a couple of seasons with his home club, Roce had stints with Waidhofen/Ybbs in the Austrian Regional League East and Örgryte in the 2005 Allsvenskan. In 2007, Roce moved to Istra 1961 where he stayed for six consecutive seasons, including the last four seasons in the 1. HNL. He scored his first goal in 1. HNL in a 2–4 defeat against Međimurje on 8 August 2009. Roce was the club’s top goalscorer during the 2012–13 season, when he netted 11 goals. In 2013, he moved to RNK Split, where he stayed for two seasons. He collected six appearances for the club during the 2014–15 UEFA Europa League. In 2015, he moved to Osijek, another 1. HNL club. On 1 July 2017, he signed with Super League club Xanthi

Career statistics (from 2007 onwards)

References

External links
 

1986 births
Living people
Sportspeople from Pula
Association football midfielders
Croatian footballers
Croatia youth international footballers
NK Žminj players
FC Waidhofen/Ybbs players
Örgryte IS players
NK Istra 1961 players
RNK Split players
NK Osijek players
Xanthi F.C. players
Croatian Football League players
Austrian Regionalliga players
Super League Greece players
Croatian expatriate footballers
Expatriate footballers in Austria
Croatian expatriate sportspeople in Austria
Expatriate footballers in Sweden
Croatian expatriate sportspeople in Sweden
Expatriate footballers in Greece
Croatian expatriate sportspeople in Greece